The Shire of Bacchus Marsh was a local government area about  west of Melbourne, the state capital of Victoria, Australia.

History

Bacchus Marsh was first incorporated as a road district on 14 October 1862, and became a shire on 23 January 1871. On 15 March 1911, it annexed part of the Lara Riding of the Shire of Corio, and on 5 February 1921, part of the shire was annexed to the Shire of Kyneton.

On 15 December 1994, the Shire of Bacchus Marsh was abolished, and along with the Shire of Ballan, was merged into the Shire of Moorabool, which was created earlier in May 1994 after the merger of the Shire of Bungaree and parts of the Shire of Buninyong.

Wards

The Shire of Bacchus Marsh was divided into four ridings in 1975, each of which elected three councillors:
 Bacchus Riding
 Coimadai Riding
 Parwan Riding
 Pentland Riding

Towns and localities
 Bacchus Marsh*
 Balliang
 Coimadai
 Darley
 Hopetoun Park
 Korobeit
 Maddingley
 Myrniong
 Parwan
 Rowsley

* Council seat.

Population

* Estimate in 1958 Victorian Year Book.

References

External links
 Victorian Places - Bacchus Marsh and Shire

Bacchus Marsh
Bacchus Marsh